The National Television System (Sistema Nacional de Televisión - SNTV) was a television network in Nicaragua, owned and operated by the government from 1990 to 1997. 

With Violeta Chamorro's triumph in the 1990 elections, Canal 6 (then part of the Sandinista Television System) became the new National Television System. In 1997 it was legally declared in bankruptcy under Arnoldo Alemán's government.

Channel 6 continued operations until 2002 and resumed its formal operations in 2011, this time under a private company run by members of the Ortega family, NEPISA.

References

Defunct television networks
Television stations in Nicaragua
1990 establishments in Nicaragua
Television channels and stations established in 1990
Television channels and stations disestablished in 1997
Television channels and stations disestablished in 2002
Defunct mass media in Nicaragua